Arthur Anthony DeCarlo, Jr. (March 23, 1931 – December 28, 2013) was an American football defensive back and end in the National Football League (NFL) for the Pittsburgh Steelers, the Washington Redskins, and the Baltimore Colts.  He played college football at the University of Georgia and was drafted in the sixth round of the 1953 NFL Draft by the Chicago Bears. He died on December 28, 2013, from complications of heart surgery. Postmortem, DeCarlo was diagnosed with chronic traumatic encephalopathy.

References

1931 births
2013 deaths
American football defensive backs
American football ends
American football players with chronic traumatic encephalopathy
Baltimore Colts players
Georgia Bulldogs football players
Pittsburgh Steelers players
Washington Redskins players
Players of American football from Youngstown, Ohio